Pseudonemesia is a genus of spiders in the family Microstigmatidae, found in Colombia and Venezuela.

Species
, the World Spider Catalog accepted the following species:

Pseudonemesia kochalkai Raven & Platnick, 1981 – Colombia
Pseudonemesia parva Caporiacco, 1955 (type species) – Venezuela

References

Mygalomorphae genera
Spiders of South America